The Shahada (Arabic: ٱلشَّهَادَةُ  , "the testimony"), also transliterated as Shahadah, is an Islamic oath and creed, and one of the Five Pillars of Islam and part of the Adhan. It reads: "I bear witness that there is no deity but God, and I bear witness that Muhammad is the Messenger of God."

The Shahada declares belief in the oneness of God and the acceptance of Muhammad as God's messenger. A single honest recitation of the Shahada is all that is required for a person to become a Muslim according to most traditional schools.

The testimonies 
The declaration reads:

"There is no deity but God."

 

"Muhammad is the Messenger of God."

The above two statements are commonly prefaced by the phrase  ("I bear witness that"), yielding the full form:

 

"I bear witness that there is no deity but God, and I bear witness that Muhammad is the Messenger of God."

Terminology and significance 
In the English translation – "There is no deity but God. Muhammad is the Messenger of God." – the first, lower-case occurrence of "god" or "deity" is a translation of the Arabic word , while the capitalized second and third occurrences of "God" are translations of the Arabic word Allah, meaning "the God".

The noun , from the verb , from the root  meaning "to observe, witness, testify", translates as "testimony" in both the everyday and the legal senses. The Islamic creed is also called, in the dual form,  (literally "two testimonies"). The expression  ("the Witness") is used in the Quran as one of the "titles of God".

In the Quran, the first statement of the Shahadah takes the form lā ʾilāha ʾillā llāh twice (37:35, 47:19), and ʾallāhu lā ʾilāha ʾillā huwa (God, there is no deity but Him) much more often. It appears in the shorter form lā ʾilāha ʾillā huwa (There is no deity but Him) in many places. It appears in these forms about 30 times in the Quran, and never attached with the other parts of the Shahada in Sunni or Shia Islam or "in conjunction with another name".

Islam's monotheistic nature is reflected in the first sentence of the Shahada, which declares belief in the oneness of God and that he is the only entity truly worthy of worship. The second sentence of the Shahada indicates the means by which God has offered guidance to human beings. The verse reminds Muslims that they accept not only the prophecy of Muhammad but also the long line of prophets who preceded him. While the first part is seen as a cosmic truth, the second is specific to Islam, as it is understood that members of the older Abrahamic religions do not view Muhammad as one of their prophets.

The Shahada is a statement of both ritual and worship. In a well-known hadith, Muhammad defines Islam as witnessing that there is no deity but God and that Muhammad is God's Messenger, giving of alms (zakat), performing the ritual prayer, fasting during the month of Ramadan, and making a pilgrimage to the Kaaba: the Five Pillars of Islam are inherent in this declaration of faith.

Recitation 

Recitation of the Shahadah is the most common statement of faith for Muslims. Sunnis, Shia Twelvers, as well as Isma'ilis consider it as one of the Five Pillars of Islam. It is whispered by the father into the ear of a newborn child, and it is whispered into the ear of a dying person. The five canonical daily prayers each include a recitation of the Shahada. Recitation of the Shahada is also the only formal step in conversion to Islam. This occasion often attracts witnesses and sometimes includes a celebration to welcome the converts into their new faith. In accordance with the central importance played by the notion of intention (niyyah) in Islamic doctrine, the recitation of the Shahada must reflect understanding of its import and heartfelt sincerity. Intention is what differentiates acts of devotion from mundane acts and a simple reading of the Shahada from invoking it as a ritual activity.

Origin 
Though the two statements of the Shahada are both present in the Quran (for instance, 37:35 and 48:29), they are not found there side by side as in the Shahada formula, but are present in the Hadiths. Versions of both phrases began to appear in coins and monumental architecture in the late seventh century, which suggests that it had not been officially established as a ritual statement of faith until then. An inscription in the Dome of the Rock (est. 692) in Jerusalem reads: "There is no deity but God alone; He has no partner with him; Muhammad is the Messenger of God". Another variant appears in coins minted after the reign of Abd al-Malik ibn Marwan, the fifth Umayyad caliph: "Muhammad is the Servant of God and His messenger". Although it is not clear when the Shahada first came into common use among Muslims, it is clear that the sentiments it expresses were part of the Quran and Islamic doctrine from the earliest period.

In Sufism 

The Shahada has been traditionally recited in the Sufi ceremony of dhikr ("remembrance"), a ritual that resembles mantras found in many other religious traditions. During the ceremony, the Shahada may be repeated thousands of times, sometimes in the shortened form of the first phrase where the word 'Allah' ("God") is replaced by 'huwa' ("Him"). The chanting of the Shahada sometimes provides a rhythmic background for singing.

In architecture and art 

The Shahada appears as an architectural element in Islamic buildings around the world, such as those in Jerusalem, Cairo, and Istanbul.

Late-medieval and Renaissance European art displays a fascination with Middle Eastern motifs in general and the Arabic script in particular, as indicated by its use, without concern for its content, in painting, architecture and book illustrations. In his San Giovenale Triptych, the Italian Renaissance artist Masaccio copied the full Shahada, written backwards, on the halo of the Madonna.

Usage on flags 

The Shahada is found on some Islamic flags. Wahhabis have used the Shahada on their flags since the 18th century. In 1902, Ibn Saud, leader of the House of Saud and the future founder of Saudi Arabia, added a sword to this flag. The modern Flag of Saudi Arabia was introduced in 1973.
The Flag of Somaliland has a horizontal strip of green, white and red with the Shahada inscribed in white on the green strip.

The flag of Afghanistan under the Taliban is a white flag with the Shahada inscribed in black. The various jihadist black flags used by Islamic insurgents since the 2000s have often followed this example. The Shahada written on a green background has been used by supporters of Hamas since about 2000. The 2004 draft constitution of Afghanistan proposed a flag featuring the Shahada in white script centered on a red background. In 2006, the Islamic State of Iraq and the Levant designed its flag using the Shahada phrase written in white on black background. The font used is supposedly similar to the font used as seal on the original letters written on Muhammad's behalf.

National flags with the Shahada

Gallery

See also 

 Adhan
 Aqidah
 Basmala
 Dhikr
 Glossary of Islam
 Iqama
 Peace be upon him
 Salawat
 Shema Yisrael
 Six Kalimas
 Takbir
 Tashahhud

Notes

References

Citations

Sources

External links 

 "The Shahadah as Truth and as Way" 

Five Pillars of Islam
Statements of faith
Shibboleths
Islamic belief and doctrine
Arabic words and phrases
Islamic terminology
Religious formulas